The rsmY RNA family is a set of related non-coding RNA genes, that like RsmZ, is regulated by the GacS/GacA signal transduction system in the plant-beneficial soil bacterium and biocontrol model organism Pseudomonas fluorescens CHA0.  GacA/GacS target genes are translationally repressed by the small RNA binding protein RsmA.  RsmY and RsmZ RNAs bind RsmA to relieve this repression and so enhance secondary metabolism and biocontrol traits.

Studies in Legionella pneumophila have shown that the ncRNAs RsmY and RsmZ together with the proteins LetA and CsrA are involved in a regulatory cascade. Also, it appears that these ncRNAs are regulated by RpoS sigma-factor.

See also 
 CsrB/RsmB RNA family
 CsrC RNA family
 PrrB/RsmZ RNA family
 RsmX
 RsmW sRNA
 CsrA protein

References

Further reading

External links 
 
 Pfam page for the CsrA protein family

Non-coding RNA